The Madonna and the Dragon (also known as Tinikling ou 'La Madonne et le Dragon') is a 1990 film written and directed by Samuel Fuller and starring Jennifer Beals.

It was Fuller's final film.

Cast
Jennifer Beals... Patty Meredith
Luc Merenda... Simon LeTerre
Patrick Bauchau... Pavel
Behn Cervantes... Mindanao
Pilar Pilapil... Mindanao's Girl
Nanding Josef... Eduardo
Christa Lang... Mama
Samuel Fuller... Chef de Bureau Newsweek

Overview
A female photojournalist covering the 1980s civil war in the Philippines photographs soldiers executing an innocent civilian. When word gets out about the photograph, newspapers want it on the front page, others want it for propaganda.

References

External links

1990 films
French action adventure films
Films directed by Samuel Fuller
Films set in the Philippines
Films shot in the Philippines
1990s French films